Xavier Escudé Torrente (born 17 May 1966 in Terrassa, Catalonia) is a former field hockey player from Spain, who won the silver medal with the men's national team at the 1996 Summer Olympics in Atlanta, Georgia. He also participated in the 1988 Summer Olympics in Seoul, and the 1992 Summer Olympics in Barcelona.

References
Spanish Olympic Committee
www.escude.org (Catalan).

External links 
 
 
 

1966 births
Living people
Spanish male field hockey players
Field hockey players from Catalonia
Olympic field hockey players of Spain
Olympic medalists in field hockey
Olympic silver medalists for Spain
Field hockey players at the 1988 Summer Olympics
Field hockey players at the 1992 Summer Olympics
Field hockey players at the 1996 Summer Olympics
Medalists at the 1996 Summer Olympics
Atlètic Terrassa players
1990 Men's Hockey World Cup players
Sportspeople from Terrassa